Anatoly Vasilievich Gladyshev (1947 – 19 February 1984) was a Russian ice speedway rider who won two world titles in 1978–1981.

Gladyshev died at a race during the 23rd heat of the 1984 Individual Ice Speedway World Championship in Moscow on 19 February 1984. After colliding with Vitaly Russkikh he fell into the path of Walter Wartbichler who was unable to avoid colliding with him. He suffered an artery rupture caused by the front tyre of the bike and died later in hospital. Gladyshev was 37 and should have retired to assume a position of mechanic in the national team but continued competing mostly to replace injured teammates.

At the time of his death he was married to his wife Diana and had two sons, Stanislav and Dmitri. After Gladyshev's death, between 1985 and 1991 an annual race in his honor was held in Irkutsk, where he lived for many years.

References

1947 births
1984 deaths
Soviet speedway riders